This article shows the roster of all participating teams at the 2016 FIVB Volleyball World League.

Group 1

























Group 2

























Group 3

























References

External links
Official website

2016
2016 in volleyball